The 1968–69 season was the 23rd season in FK Partizan's existence. This article shows player statistics and matches that the club played during the 1968–69 season.

Players

Squad information

Friendlies

Competitions

Yugoslav First League

Yugoslav Cup

See also
 List of FK Partizan seasons

References

External links
 Official website
 Partizanopedia 1968-69  (in Serbian)

FK Partizan seasons
Partizan